Conceição do Tocantins is a municipality located in the Brazilian state of Tocantins. Its population was 4,087 (2020) and its area is 2,501 km².

References

Municipalities in Tocantins